Crater Reserve may refer to:

Be'eri Crater Reserve, Israel
Luba Crater Scientific Reserve,  Equatorial Guinea
Ngorongoro Crater Reserve, Tanzania
Tswaing Crater Reserve, Gauteng, South Africa

See also
Henbury Meteorites Conservation Reserve
Craters of the Moon National Monument and Preserve